Miles Oscar Noll (March 30, 1862 – November 27, 1905) was an American clergyman, educator, and college football coach.

Biography
Noll was born on March 30, 1862, in Lewisburg, Pennsylvania to Hannah Ritter and John Riem Noll. He attended Franklin & Marshall College and graduated around 1885. He married Katherine Merkle Follmer June 25, 1891 in Lewisburg, Pennsylvania.

Coaching career
Noll was the first head football coach at Franklin & Marshall College in Lancaster, Pennsylvania, serving for one season, in  1887 season, and compiling a record of 0–2.

Clergy
Noll became a pastor and president of the Potomac Synod of the Reformed Church, living in Carlisle, Pennsylvania.

Death
Noll died from typhoid fever, on November 27, 1905, in Carlisle.

Head coaching record

References

External links
 

1862 births
1905 deaths
19th-century American clergy
Franklin & Marshall Diplomats football coaches
Franklin & Marshall College alumni
Reformed Church in America ministers
People from Lewisburg, Pennsylvania
Coaches of American football from Pennsylvania
Deaths from typhoid fever